Kenneth Leroy Hinton (born July 2, 1955) is an American former professional football player who was a cornerback in the Canadian Football League (CFL) for nine seasons the BC Lions and Saskatchewan Roughriders. Hinton played college football at San Diego State University.

References

Career stats

1955 births
Living people
American football cornerbacks
American players of Canadian football
Canadian football defensive backs
BC Lions players
Saskatchewan Roughriders players
San Diego State Aztecs football players
People from Los Angeles